Cakić is a Serbian surname. Notable people with the surname include:

Mihajlo Cakić (born 1990), Serbian footballer
Riki Cakić (born 1990), Bosnian-born Swedish footballer

Serbian surnames